Rodrigue Kokouendo (born 21 June 1974) is a French politician of La République En Marche! (LREM) who served as a member of the French National Assembly from 2017 to 2022, representing the department of Seine-et-Marne.

Early career
Kokouendo holds a master's degree in management and a higher diploma in accounting and finance. He worked as an accountant at BNP Paribas and was a city councilor of Villeparisis from 2008 to 2014.

Political career
Having previously been an active member of the Socialist Party, Kokuendo joined LREM in 2016. He was elected deputy of the 7th constituency of Seine-et-Marne during the legislative elections of 2017 under the colors of La République en marche! with 61.48% of the votes.

In parliament, Kokouendo served on the Committee on Foreign Affairs. In addition to his committee assignments, he was a member of the French-Angolan Parliamentary Friendship Group, the French-Nigerian Parliamentary Friendship Group, and the French-South Sudanese Parliamentary Friendship Group. In 2020, Kokouendo joined En commun (EC), a group within LREM led by Barbara Pompili.

Kokouendo lost his seat in the first round of the 2022 French legislative election.

Political positions
In July 2019, Kokouendo voted in favor of the French ratification of the European Union’s Comprehensive Economic and Trade Agreement (CETA) with Canada.

See also
 2017 French legislative election

References

1974 births
Living people
Deputies of the 15th National Assembly of the French Fifth Republic
La République En Marche! politicians
Black French politicians